In geometry, the gyroelongated pentagonal pyramid is one of the Johnson solids. As its name suggests, it is formed by taking a pentagonal pyramid and "gyroelongating" it, which in this case involves joining a pentagonal antiprism to its base.

It can also be seen as a diminished icosahedron, an icosahedron with the top (a pentagonal pyramid) chopped off by a plane. Other Johnson solids can be formed by cutting off multiple pentagonal pyramids from an icosahedron: the pentagonal antiprism and metabidiminished icosahedron (two pyramids removed), and the tridiminished icosahedron (three pyramids removed).

Dual polyhedron 

The dual of the gyroelongated pentagonal pyramid has 11 faces: 5 kites, 1 regular pentagonal and 5 irregular pentagons.

External links
 

Johnson solids
Pyramids and bipyramids